Bălcești may refer to several places in Romania:

Bălcești, a town in Vâlcea County
Bălcești, a village in Beliș Commune, Cluj County
Bălcești, a village in Căpușu Mare Commune, Cluj County
Bălcești, a village in Bengești-Ciocadia Commune, Gorj County
Bălcești, a former commune, now part of Nicolae Bălcescu Commune, Vâlcea County